Koba is a Georgian given name. Notable people with the name include:

Koba Davitashvili (1971–2020), Georgian politician
Koba Gogoladze (born 1973), Georgian boxer
Koba Gurtskaia (born 1966), Georgian military officer
Koba Gvenetadze (born 1971), Georgian economist
Koba Jass (born 1990), Latvian ice hockey player
Koba Kobaladze (born 1969), Georgian military officer
Koba Shalamberidze (born 1984), Georgian footballer
Koba Subeliani (born 1979), Georgian politician
Koba Zakadze (born 1934), Soviet Georgian ski jumper

Georgian masculine given names